is a town located in Ibaraki Prefecture, Japan. , the town had an estimated population of 8,162 in 2987 households and a population density of 353 persons per km². The percentage of the population aged over 65 was 34.7%.

Geography
Goka is located in the flatlands in the very western portion of Ibaraki Prefecture, bordered by Saitama Prefecture to the west and south, Chiba Prefecture to the east. The Tone River, along with the Edo River and Naka River pass through the town. Goka is approximately 50 kilometers from central Tokyo.

Rivers 
Tone River
Edo River
Naka River
Gongendo River(Lake Miyuki)
Fuyugi-otoshi River
Goka-otoshi River

Place names 
Motokurihashi
Kawatsuma
Kotesashi
Shinkōya
Kofukuda
Ōfukuda
Sanno-yama
Sanno
Egawa
Kōshu
Goka-mirai
Fuyugi
Maebayashi
Shaka
Harajukudai

Neighboring municipalities
Ibaraki Prefecture
Koga
Sakai
Saitama Prefecture
Kuki
Satte
Chiba Prefecture
Noda

Climate
Goka has a Humid continental climate (Köppen Cfa) characterized by warm summers and cool winters with light snowfall.  The average annual temperature in Goka is 14.5 °C. The average annual rainfall is 1326 mm with September as the wettest month. The temperatures are highest on average in August, at around 26.6 °C, and lowest in January, at around 3.4 °C.

Demographics
Per Japanese census data, the population of Goka peaked around the year 2000 and has declined since.

History
The area of present-day Goka was part of Shimōsa Province and was transferred to Ibaraki Prefecture in 1875 after the start of the Meiji period. The area was organized into the village of Goka within Nishikatsushika District, Ibaraki with the establishment of the modern municipalities system on 1 April 1889. The district was abolished in 1896, becoming part of Sashima District. Goka was raised to town status on 1 June 1996.

Government
Goka has a mayor-council form of government with a directly elected mayor and a unicameral town council of 10 members. Goka, together with neighboring Bandō and Sakai, contributes two members to the Ibaraki Prefectural Assembly. In terms of national politics, the town is part of Ibaraki 7th district of the lower house of the Diet of Japan.

Economy

Industrial Park 
Doyobu, Kawatsuma, Egawa, Ōsaki, Ondashi and Goka IC industrial park

Company office and plant 
Kewpie Corporation, Goka plant
Yakult Honsha Company Limited, Ibaraki plant
Kyodo Printing Company Limited, Goka plant
SHINCHOSHA Publishing Company Limited, Goka Office
KIKKOMAN SoyFoods Company, Ibaraki plant
KATO WORKS Company Limited, Ibaraki plant

Public institutions

Education
Goka has one public elementary school and one public middle school operated by the town government. The town does not have a high school.
Goka-nishi elementary school
Goka-higashi elementary school
Goka junior high school

Public facilities
Goka town hall
Goka post office
Goka Harajukudai post office
Goka town B&G Marine center
Environmental purification center
Kawatsuma water purification plant

Fire department
Koga fire department(Koga-city)
Goka branch

Police department
Ibaraki prefectural police, Sakai police station(Sakai-town)
Motokurihashi police box
Kofukuda police box

Transportation

Railway
Goka does not have any passenger railway service.
Tohoku Shinkansen pass through northern part of the town.

Expressway
  – Goka Interchange

Highway
 
Roadside station Goka (government-designated rest area)

Prefectural Road
Prefecture Route 267
Prefecture Route 268

Bus
Route Bus(operated by Asahi bus)
Goka town hall - Tatsudō - Satte station
Community transportation "Gokarin-go" (operated by Asahi bus, operation route depending on the time of day except Sunday and holidays)
Minami-kurihashi station - Saiseikai Kurihashi Hospital - Goka town hall - Goka Egawa-honson (Morning and evening time route)
Beisia Supermarket Kurihashi Store - Minami-kurihashi station - Saiseikai Kurihashi Hospital - Goka town hall - Motokurihashi-ikenari - Dōmu Park - Tatsudō - Roadside station Goka - Goka Egawa-honson(Daytime route)

Local attractions
Kurihashi castle ruins
Tōshōji temple
Ana-yakushi ancient tomb
Fuyugi A・B shellmound
Nakanoshima Park
Dōmu Park
Roadside station Goka
Information and disaster station Goka

References

External links

Official Website 

Towns in Ibaraki Prefecture
Goka, Ibaraki